Ex Libris may refer to:
An Ex Libris (bookplate), a label affixed to a book to indicate ownership
Ex Libris (band), a Dutch metal band
Ex Libris (bookshop), a Swiss retail company
"Ex Libris" (Charmed), a 2000 episode of the television series Charmed
Ex Libris: Confessions of a Common Reader, a 1998 collection of essays by Anne Fadiman
Ex Libris (game), a party game
Ex Libris Group, an Israeli software company that sells library automation software 
Exlibris (music label), subsidiary of Danish publisher Gyldendal.
Ex Libris: The New York Public Library, a 2017 American documentary film
 Ex Libris, an imprint of Rizzoli International Publications

See also
Rex Libris, a comic book series by James Turner
Xlibris, a publishing and printing services provider based in Indiana